The Gap Band is the second album by the Gap Band in 1977 on Tattoo/RCA Records. This is not to be confused with the 1979 Mercury Records self-titled album.

Track listing

Personnel
 Charles Wilson – keyboards, lead vocals
 Robert Wilson – bass, vocals
 Ronnie Wilson – trumpet, electric piano, vocals
 James Macon – guitar
 Tommy Lokey – trumpet
 Chris Clayton – alto and tenor saxophone, vocals
 The Gap Band –  percussion, backing vocals
 Rick Calhoun – drums
 Leon Russell – piano 
 Chaka Khan, D.J. Rogers, Mary Russell, Johnny Lee Samuels – backing vocals
 The Cornerstone Institutional Baptist and Southern Californian Community Choir – choir
 Reverend James Cleveland – choir director
 Les McCann – keyboards
 Jesse Ehrlich – cello
 Jerry Jumonville – alto saxophone 
 Gino Piserchio, Robert Margouleff – synthesizer

Charts
Singles

References

External links
The Gap Band (1977) at Discogs

1977 albums
The Gap Band albums